Mr. Rhythm is the sole album led by jazz guitarist Freddie Green. The album was recorded in late 1955 for RCA Victor.

Reception

The Allmusic review by Ronnie D. Lankford, Jr. stated "This album shows him to be a fine leader who is happy to remain in his role as rhythm guitarist. For fans of Green, and for those who enjoy swinging jazz with great soloists, Mr. Rhythm is a fine release."

Track listing

Personnel 
 Freddie Green – guitar
 Joe Newman – trumpet
 Henry Coker – trombone
 Al Cohn – tenor saxophone, clarinet
 Nat Pierce – piano
 Milt Hinton – double bass
 Osie Johnson – drums
 Jo Jones – drums

References 

1956 albums
RCA Records albums
Freddie Green albums
Albums arranged by Manny Albam
Albums arranged by Ernie Wilkins